D49 may refer to:
 Columbus Municipal Airport (North Dakota)
 D49 motorway (Czech Republic)
 D49 road (Croatia)
 Falcon School District 49, in Colorado
 Kyrie in D minor, D 49 (Schubert)
 LNER Class D49, a 1927 British class of 4-4-0 steam locomotives
 Semi-Slav Defense, a chess opening